Heaven Dance is an album by The Leaders Trio, pianist Kirk Lightsey, bassist Cecil McBee and drummer Don Moye, that was recorded in 1988 and released by the Sunnyside label.

Reception 

The AllMusic review states "Although there is close interplay by the musicians, the pianist is the lead voice, so one can look at this set as being a date by the Kirk Lightsey Trio. Excellent modern mainstream music".

The authors of the Penguin Guide to Jazz Recordings wrote that the album "sends us back to the original Leaders sets with a heightened awareness of what was going on in the warp-factor engine-room. Which is not to say that Heaven Dance is not a substantial achievement on its own terms... Recommended."

Track listing 
 "Peacemaker" (Cecil McBee) – 7:39
 "Unc'a Bubba" (Gary Bartz) – 6:24
 "Cecil to Cecil" (McBee) – 4:37
 "This Is All I Ask" (Gordon Jenkins) – 4:55
 "Heaven Dance" (Kirk Lightsey) – 6:37
 "Little Big John" (McBee) – 5:44
 "Fresh Air" (Lightsey) – 7:55
 "Ode to Wilbur Ware" (Don Moye) – 6:53

Personnel 
Kirk Lightsey – piano, flute
Cecil McBee – bass
Don Moye – drums, percussion

References 

The Leaders albums
1988 albums
Sunnyside Records albums